A digital locker or cyberlocker is an online file or digital media storage service.  Files stored include music, videos, movies, games and other media.  The term was used by Microsoft as a part of its Windows Marketplace in 2004. By storing files in a digital locker, users are able to access them anywhere they can find internet connections. Most (but not all) digital locker services require a user to register. Prices range from free to paid, divided according to the complications and strength of the lock.

Uses
Digital lockers, as opposed to simple file storage services, are typically associated with digital distribution — a commercial store where you can buy content such as Steam, Google Play, Amazon, and iTunes.

Download / Play / Watch 
 
Digital locker services often come with integrated client software that allows users to play the movies or games or songs.

Upload

Many digital locker services enable users to upload their own content or provide synchronization software that will scan a user's computer and upload the appropriate media for them.

Matching

Some services like Google Play and iTunes will match songs users have to a digital signature, allowing them to skip the sometimes slow process of uploading the media file.  Rather, once the song is matched, it will just be added to a user's library.

Digital rights management
Digital lockers are often used as a way of controlling access to media via Digital Rights Management (DRM).  Services such as Steam, Origin, Blizzard, Vudu, and others offer to users the convenience of a digital locker in exchange for the control of DRM.

Copyright infringement
Some digital locker services such as Hotfile and MegaUpload have been accused of being large contributors towards copyright infringement. The MPAA alleged that Hotfile and similar services promote copyright infringement by paying users referral fees, and thus encouraging them to upload popular copyrighted content.

See also
File hosting service
Cloud storage
Comparison of file hosting services
Comparison of file synchronization software
Comparison of online backup services
Comparison of online music lockers
File sharing
Digital distribution

References

Video game development
Digital rights management